Nicky Hayen (born 16 August 1980) is a Belgian football manager and former professional footballer who is currently manager of Belgian First Division B side Club NXT.

Career
From 1999 on, Hayen played nine seasons at the highest level of Belgian professional football with Sint-Truiden, before moving to RBC Roosendaal in the second division in the Netherlands for two seasons. He returned to Belgium in 2010 by joining Oud-Heverlee Leuven and was part of the team achieving promotion to the Belgian Pro League. In the summer of 2012, he was loaned out for one season to Antwerp, but when the season ended he was released and became player-coach at Dender EH in the Belgian Third Division. In February 2014, he was relieved of his coaching duties at Dender EH due to bad result, but stayed with the team as player.

On 31 December 2021, Hayen was announced as manager of 
Cymru Premier club Haverfordwest County on an initial 18-month contract. This was duly extended for a further 12 months upon confirmation of safety towards the end of the 2021-2022 season, after an excellent run of form. Hayen was the first Belgian manager to work in the Cymru Premier. He left the club in June 2022 to return to Belgium to take up a position as manager of Club Brugge's under-23 team, Club NXT.

References

1980 births
Living people
Belgian footballers
Belgian Pro League players
Challenger Pro League players
Sint-Truidense V.V. players
RBC Roosendaal players
Oud-Heverlee Leuven players
Royal Antwerp F.C. players
F.C.V. Dender E.H. players
Eerste Divisie players
Belgian expatriate footballers
Expatriate footballers in the Netherlands
Belgian expatriate sportspeople in the Netherlands
Association football forwards
Sint-Truidense V.V. managers
S.K. Beveren managers
Belgian football managers
Haverfordwest County A.F.C. managers
Expatriate football managers in Wales
People from Sint-Truiden
Footballers from Limburg (Belgium)
Club Brugge KV non-playing staff